The Commonwealth Range is a north-south trending range of rugged mountains,  long, located within the Queen Maud Mountains on the Dufek Coast of the continent of Antarctica. The range borders the eastern side of Beardmore Glacier from the Ross Ice Shelf to Keltie Glacier.

The range was discovered by the British Antarctic Expedition (1907–09) and named by the expedition after the Commonwealth of Australia, which gave much assistance to the expedition.

Key features
Its highest peak is Flat Top at 4000 meters or 13,123 feet.  Other peaks within the range include:
Mount Donaldson – 
Mount Macdonald – 
Mount Hermanson – 
Mount Deakin – 
Gray Peak – 
Flat Top's next highest neighbor is the massive Mount Kaplan  to the east-northeast.

Features
Geographical features include:

 Airdrop Peak
 Beardmore Glacier
 Beetle Spur
 Celebration Pass
 Dolphin Spur
 Ebony Ridge
 Flat Top
 Hood Glacier
 Keltie Glacier
 Lands End Nunataks
 Ludeman Glacier
 Mount Cyril
 Mount Donaldson
 Mount Harcourt
 Mount Henry
 Mount Kathleen
 Mount Kyffin
 Mount Patrick
 Mount Robert Scott
 Osicki Glacier
 Pain Neve
 Separation Range
 Siege Dome

References

Queen Maud Mountains
Dufek Coast